Sylvain Hoyer is a French sprint canoer who competed in the mid to late 1990s. He won three bronze medals at the ICF Canoe Sprint World Championships (C-2 200 m: 1994, C-4 200 m: 1995, C-4 500 m: 1999).

References

French male canoeists
Living people
Year of birth missing (living people)
ICF Canoe Sprint World Championships medalists in Canadian